Francesco Pretti (28 September 1903 - 16 April 1988) was an Italian racewalker who competed at the 1932 Summer Olympics. and at the 1948 Summer Olympics.

References

External links
 

1903 births
1988 deaths
Athletes (track and field) at the 1932 Summer Olympics
Athletes (track and field) at the 1948 Summer Olympics
Italian male racewalkers
Olympic athletes of Italy
20th-century Italian people